Eusebio de Granito (died 1528) was a Roman Catholic prelate who served as Bishop of Capri (1514–1528).

Biography
On 18 August 1514, Eusebio de Granito was appointed during the papacy of Pope Leo X as Bishop of Capri.
He served as Bishop of Capri until his death in 1528.

References

External links and additional sources
 (for Chronology of Bishops) 
 (for Chronology of Bishops) 

16th-century Italian Roman Catholic bishops
1528 deaths
Bishops appointed by Pope Leo X